Paṇḍita (Sanskrit; Tibetan: khepa; Wyl: mkhas pa) was a title in Indian Buddhism awarded to scholars who have mastered the five sciences (Sanskrit: pañcavidyāsthāna; Tib. rigné chenpo nga; Wyl. rig gnas chen po lnga) in which a learned person was traditionally supposed to be well-versed. 

The five sciences are: science of language (śabdavidyā), science of logic (hetuvidyā), science of medicine (cikitsāvidyā), science of fine arts and crafts (śilakarmasthānavidyā), and science of spirituality (adhyātmavidyā). The stipulation can be traced to (but may well predate) the Mahāyāna-sūtrālamkāra-kārikā, which states: "Without becoming a scholar in the five sciences, not even the supreme sage can become omniscient. For the sake of refuting and supporting others, and for the sake of knowing everything himself, he makes an effort in these [five sciences]."

The first (and one of the only) Tibetans afforded the title was Sakya Pandita. For other notable Buddhists afforded the title, see Pandita.

References 

Tibetan Buddhist titles
Tibetan Buddhism in India
Sanskrit words and phrases